Carlos Guillermo Haydon Otamendi (born March 25, 1976) is a Venezuelan actor and model known for his role in telenovelas. He is the nephew of Marcel Granier, CEO and Chairman of RCTV.

Biography
Before venturing into acting, Carlos studied Advertising and Marketing at the Instituto Nuevas Profesiones. He started his acting career by working as a model in fashion shows and appearing in commercials while studying acting. He got an opportunity to study with acclaimed acting coach Nelson Ortega at Luz Columba, RCTV's acting school.

In 2010, he starred as the protagonist in the telenovela Salvador de Mujeres where he played a boxer and gigolo.

Personal life
In 2002, Carlos began a relationship with fellow actress Eileen Abad. On 30 November 2007, they were officially married at Santa Ana de la Lagunita Church. In 2011, the couple welcomed their first child, a son named Christopher.

However, the couple began divorce proceedings in January 2013 citing irreconcilable differences and Carlos' ongoing relationship with his co-star in the telenovela Dulce Amargo, Roxana Díaz.

Telenovelas

References

External links

Living people
Venezuelan male models
Venezuelan male telenovela actors
RCTV personalities
1976 births